The 13th People's Choice Awards, honoring the best in popular culture for 1986, were held in 1987. They were broadcast on CBS.

Winners

Favorite Motion Picture Actress:
Meryl Streep

Favorite TV Comedy Program:
The Cosby Show

Favorite Country Music Performer:
Kenny Rogers

Favorite Female Performer in a New TV Program:
Pam Dawber

Favorite Female TV Performer:
Cybill Shepherd

Favorite Game Show Host:
Pat Sajak

Favorite New TV Comedy Program:
ALF

Favorite All-Around Female Entertainer:
Barbara Mandrell,
Cybill Shepherd (tie)

Favorite Young TV Performer:
Emmanuel Lewis

Favorite Motion Picture:
Top Gun

Favorite Motion Picture Actor:
Clint Eastwood

Favorite New TV Dramatic Program:
L.A. Law

Favorite Nighttime Dramatic Serial:
Dallas,
Dynasty (tie)

Favorite TV Dramatic Program:
Hill Street Blues

Favorite All-Around Male Entertainer:
Bill Cosby

Favorite Female Musical Performer:
Whitney Houston,
Madonna (tie)

Favorite Male Musical Performer:
Lionel Richie

Favorite Male Performer in a New TV Program:
Andy Griffith

Favorite Male TV Performer:
Bill Cosby

Favorite Music Video:
"Dancing on the Ceiling"

Favorite Musical Group:
Alabama

Favorite Talk Show Host:
Johnny Carson

References

People's Choice Awards
1986 awards
1987 in American television
1986 awards in the United States
March 1987 events in the United States